For the film character portrayed by Jerry Lewis see The King of Comedy (film)

Jerry Langford is an American animation director who directed several episodes of the animated series Family Guy.

Langford has also served as Assistant Director on Avatar: The Last Airbender, character layout artist on The Oblongs, King of the Hill and Mission Hill.

Family Guy
Langford joined Family Guy in 2005. He is an animator for Family Guy. He has since directed multiple episodes, including:
 episode #116: "Tales of a Third Grade Nothing"
 episode #123: "Stew-Roids"
 episode #132: "Quagmire's Baby"
 episode #141: "Brian Griffin's House of Payne"
 episode #180: "Burning Down the Bayit"
 episode #195: "Friends Without Benefits"
 episode #201: "Chris Cross"
 episode #210: "No Country Club for Old Men"
 episode #221: "Brian's a Bad Father"
 episode #334: "Cat Fight"
 episode #356: "Wild Wild West"

References

External links

American television directors
Living people
Year of birth missing (living people)